"Full Steam" was the second single taken from David Gray's eighth studio album Draw the Line. The song is a duet between Gray and Annie Lennox. Originally planned to be officially released as a single on 23 November 2009, the single release was delayed with a new release date set as 28 December 2009, although no singles were to be found at such date. A music video featuring Gray and Lennox was filmed for the song, as it was eventually only released as a download single with all proceeds from the sale of the single going to Children in Need. Only physical single releases were for promotional releases only.

Gray and Lennox performed the song on Later... with Jools Holland to promote its single release. The music video for the song premiered when it was uploaded on Annie Lennox's Official YouTube Channel on 19 November 2009.

Track listing
Promo – CD-Single Polydor – (UMG) [cat# GRAY3]
 "Full Steam" (Radio Edit) – 3:49
 "Full Steam" (Instrumental) – 4:12

Download – Polydor – (UMG)
 "Full Steam" – 4:11

References

David Gray (musician) songs
Annie Lennox songs
2009 singles
Songs written by David Gray (musician)
2009 songs
Polydor Records singles
Folk rock songs